Gol Mokharan (also Romanized as Gol Mokhārān and Golmokhrān; also known as Kalamkhvārān) is a village in Dughayi Rural District, in the Central District of Quchan County, Razavi Khorasan Province, Iran. At the 2006 census, its population was 117, in 31 families.

References 

Populated places in Quchan County